Phabullo Rodrigues da Silva (born 1 November 1993), known professionally as Pabllo Vittar, is a Brazilian drag queen and singer.

Life and career

1993–2016: Early life 
Born in São Luís, Phabullo is a dizygotic twin and has an older sister. Phabullo spent part of his childhood and adolescence living in the cities of Santa Inês and Caxias, both in the interior of Maranhão, due to financial difficulties. He never knew his father, who abandoned his mother, a nurse, when she was pregnant with him.

During his childhood, Phabullo experienced bullying because of his delicate gestures and feminine voice. He was physically assaulted with a plate of hot soup strewn over his face. He attended ballet classes during this period.

At the age of 13, Phabullo began doing covers at family parties and school performances and joined a choir at a Catholic church. Soon after, he began songwriting. Later, he decided to become a professional, moving to Indaiatuba with his sister, where he worked in several places, such as snack bars and beauty salons. Soon after, he moved to Uberlândia with his mother, who had recently married. At the age of 15, he came out to his mother, who had suspected that he was gay; his sister already knew about his sexual orientation. His mother, whom he talks to daily, is supportive of his sexual orientation.

He then began to go out for the night in Maranhão, to make friends, and to participate as one of a selection of singers in a house of shows. He started performing his own songs and impersonating celebrities for a small fee, but it was not a professional job. He was now dressing feminine, but did not identify himself as a drag queen; the first time that he did drag was at age 17 in Uberlândia, to publicize a party of his friend by delivering pamphlets at the door of a nightclub. With time, he started performing in LGBT parades in several cities of Maranhão and became known by the state's LGBT community. At age 18, in Minas Gerais, Phabullo started participating in and winning some beauty contests in full drag, before beginning his professional career as a singer while adopting the stage name of "Pabllo Knowles", an homage to singer Beyoncé. His first performance as a drag queen occurred at the Belgrano nightclub, of producers Ian Hayashi and Leocádio Rezende (whom Phabullo would later call his "parents").

Still in Minas Gerais, Phabullo took a university entrance exam by the Federal University of Uberlândia, where he was admitted to the full design course in 2013, but after some periods he dropped out of college due to his schedule of shows, which increased greatly due to the success of his music videos on the internet and his participation in the band of primetime television program Amor & Sexo.

When he attracted attention from entrepreneurs in the entertainment field, Phabullo began his musical career professionally, performing in bars and concert halls in Uberlândia and cities of the region. In this period, Phabullo adopted the stage name of Pabllo Vittar.

Vittar appeared on TV for the first time in 2014, on a Brazilian talent singing show, performing "I Have Nothing" by Whitney Houston. He became famous in the media in 2015 with the success of his music video "Open Bar", a Portuguese-language version of Major Lazer's song "Lean On" with original lyrics, produced by Bonde do Rolê and Omulu. In less than four months, the video reached one million views on YouTube. He also released an extended play with the same name, using pop hits' instrumentals with new arrangements and lyrics.

2017: Vai Passar Mal 
On 12 January 2017, his debut studio album Vai Passar Mal was released – including the singles "Nêga", "Todo Dia", "K.O.", "Corpo Sensual", "Então Vai" (with Diplo) and "Indestrutível". In the same month he released "Todo Dia" as the second single of the album, which became notorious at Brazilian Carnival due to its lyrics. The third single "K.O." became an even bigger hit and brought Vittar to nationwide fame and success; as of 2021, the song has over 381 million views on YouTube. The fourth single, "Corpo Sensual", was released on 6 September 2017, to similar success, resulting in over 321 million views on YouTube.

Vittar has been featured in songs by international artists such as Major Lazer's "Sua Cara" (with fellow Brazilian singer Anitta). The music video was released on 30 July 2017, and reached 10th place on the list of most-viewed online videos in the first 24 hours, with 25 million views. The singer also appears on "I Got It", from Charli XCX's fourth mixtape Pop 2. Vittar collaborated again with XCX on "Flash Pose", released on 25 July 2019; the single was later included on Vittar's album 111. He also got to perform "Flash Pose" at the 2019 MTV Europe Music Awards.

2018: Não Para Não 

On 15 August 2018, Pabllo Vittar released his second studio album Não Para Não – including the singles "Problema Seu", "Disk Me", "Seu Crime", "Buzina", and "Não Vou Deitar". Vittar toured in support of the album, in Brazil and internationally. An extended tour called NPN Pride saw Vittar performing in various pride parades throughout USA and Canada. The first two singles were released to great success, with "Disk Me" reaching over 85 million views and "Problema Seu" reaching over 112 million views on Youtube. The singles "Seu Crime" and "Buzina" also were successful, albeit with smaller numbers, with both reaching over 25 million views on Youtube. This album also featured Brazilian singers Dilsinho and Ludmilla in "Trago seu Amor de Volta" and "Vai Embora", respectively.

2019–2020: 111 
On 31 October 2019, Pabllo Vittar released the 111 1 EP – including the singles "Parabéns" (with Brazilian rapper Psirico), "Amor de Que" and "Flash Pose" (with Charli XCX). Following the success of the 111 1 EP, "Amor de Que" rose to success thanks to the 2020 Brazilian Carnival, with the song reaching over 50 million views in just a month; as of 2021, the song has over 138 million views. "Parabéns" was released as the second single and also enjoyed similar success, with over 127 million views on Youtube as of 2020. "Flash Pose" had modest success, reaching over 25 million views on YouTube.

On 24 March 2020, Vittar's third studio album 111 was released – including the singles "Clima Quente" (with Brazilian Jerry Smith), "Tímida" (with Thalía) and "Rajadão"; the songs from the EP were also included in the album. Vittar collaborated with various artists on the album, and included songs in Portuguese, English and Spanish.

With the nomination of "Sua Cara" at the 19th Annual Latin Grammy Awards, Vittar became the first Grammy-nominated drag queen. He also became the first drag queen to win an EMA award in its 25-year run for Best Brazilian Act. The following year, he consecutively won again.

Artistry

Musical and vocal style 
Vittar is mainly a pop singer, although his music incorporates other genres. His debut studio album Vai Passar Mal mixes pop with elements of electronic music and Brazilian genres such as tecno brega, arrocha, funk carioca, and forró. Music critics noted that his second studio album Não Para Não follows a similar formula, mixing Brazilian and international influences. Speaking about the latter album, Vittar explained: "I lived in Santa Izabel do Pará and listened to cumbia, carimbó, tecnobrega and guitarrada. In Maranhão, I heard axé and Bahia pagode... Pabllo Vittar is all over this album, I cannot go against my origins." His lyrics often explore themes such as love, self-confidence, and partying.

Vittar is a countertenor with 2.3 octaves of vocal extension already exhibited, spanning from flat E in the third octave (E♭3) to G# in the fifth octave (G♯5). Sérgio Anders, a singing professor at the State University of Minas Gerais, considers Vittar to have "an infantile voice in an adult male". While he views Vittar as a good singer, Anders opines that his technique is not very developed. Shannon Sims of The New York Times described Vittar's voice as a "nasal soprano".

Influences 

Vittar grew up listening to artists such as Aretha Franklin, Donna Summer, Whitney Houston, and Tina Turner, whom he imitated as a child before he even considered becoming a drag queen, as well as Gilberto Gil, Ney Matogrosso, Elis Regina, Alcione Nazareth, and Caetano Veloso. He became interested in drag after watching the reality show RuPaul's Drag Race and cited RuPaul as an important inspiration: "All the drag artists in this world have to thank RuPaul for the visibility we have today." Some participants of the show have also influenced Vittar, notably April Carrion and Naomi Smalls. Model Bella Hadid visually influences him, especially his makeup and style. His music and performances are greatly influenced by bands such as Banda Batidão and Companhia do Calypso.

Early in his career, he used the stage name Pabllo Knowles as a reference to Beyoncé. Other influences include Rihanna, Kanye West, Lady Gaga, and Britney Spears, as well as his "Sua Cara" collaborators Anitta and Major Lazer. While making his debut album Vai Passar Mal, Vittar explained that he listened to several artists to find inspiration, citing Liniker and Elza Soares as examples. The album was also influenced by Lana Del Rey, Allie X, Rihanna's album Anti, and Beyoncé's album Lemonade.

Public image and impact 
 Vittar's music is considered as "unofficial anthems for Brazil's lesbian, gay, bisexual, and transgender community" and he is widely viewed as a voice for them. Because dangers to LGBTQ+ people have grown in Brazil, Vittar's openness about being gay has made him an icon to those living in a prejudiced environment. As an openly gay Brazilian drag queen, Vittar has served as a positive representation of homosexuality and gender fluidity. He used his visibility to support LGBTQ+ individuals in Brazil and in other countries in South America. He said: "They tell me a lot about their daily struggle to go out on the street being gay, being drag. I want to give them strength so they can continue being who they are." Vittar also appeared on A Força do Querer ("Edge of Desire"), a popular telenovela about a transgender man. After seeing Vittar perform at the Rock in Rio festival, actor Fábio Assunção wrote in a Facebook post: "You represent the possibility of truth in a sea of hypocrisy. Your public figure is the voice of many suffocated people."

In an interview for Veja magazine, Vittar revealed that he chose a masculine stage name because he wanted to be truthful to the public, since he is not transgender. He only acts as a woman when he's on stage as Pabllo Vittar and has a more typical masculine gender expression in his private life. During the same interview, Vittar said he is "making music for humans." In October 2022 Vittar came out as gender-fluid on the PodPah podcast.

Since his debut, Vittar became the most followed and most streamed drag queen in the world, surpassing RuPaul. In 2020, Vittar was featured in a campaign for Calvin Klein, as part of the designer's pride collection.

Discography 

 Vai Passar Mal (2017)
 Não Para Não (2018)
 111 (2020)
 Batidão Tropical (2021)
 Noitada (2023)

Filmography

Film

Television

Internet

Tours 
Open Bar Tour (2015–2016)
Vai Passar Mal Tour (2017–2018)
Não Para Não Tour (2018–2019)
Não Para Não PRIDE Tour (Summer 2019)
 Não Para Não 2.0 Tour (Fall 2019–Spring 2020)
Tour with Pabllo (2022)

Canceled tour 
111 Tour (2020–2021)

Awards and nominations

See also 
 Zemmoa

References

External links 

 
 
 Pabllo Vittar on Dicionário Cravo Albin da Música Popular Brasileira (in Portuguese)

1993 births
Living people
People from São Luís, Maranhão
Brazilian male singer-songwriters
Brazilian bloggers
Brazilian male dancers
Brazilian dance musicians
Brazilian pop male singers
Brazilian LGBT rights activists
Brazilian drag queens
Brazilian LGBT singers
Brazilian LGBT songwriters
MTV Europe Music Award winners
Brazilian twins
20th-century Brazilian dancers
21st-century Brazilian dancers
20th-century Brazilian male singers
20th-century Brazilian singers
21st-century Brazilian male singers
21st-century Brazilian singers
Male bloggers
20th-century Brazilian LGBT people
21st-century Brazilian LGBT people
LGBT people in Latin music
Non-binary drag performers
Non-binary dancers
Non-binary singers
Non-binary songwriters
Genderfluid people
Brazilian non-binary people